Aaron Kelly may refer to:
Aaron Kelly (singer) (born 1993), American singer from Sonestown, Pennsylvania
Aaron Kelly (Canadian football) (born 1986), Canadian football wide receiver

See also
Erin Kelly (disambiguation)